Novoulyanovsk is a town in Ulyanovsk Oblast, Russia, located on the right bank of the Volga River,  south of Ulyanovsk. Population:

History
It was founded in 1960 as a settlement around a cement factory. Urban-type settlement status was granted to it in 1961 and a town status—in 1967.

Administrative and municipal status
Within the framework of administrative divisions, it is, together with five rural localities, incorporated as the town of oblast significance of Novoulyanovsk—an administrative unit with the status equal to that of the districts. As a municipal division, the town of oblast significance of Novoulyanovsk is incorporated as Novoulyanovsk Urban Okrug.

Economy
Today there are significant reserves of raw materials for cement production, cement factory here working  Eurocement group, factories asbestos cement products and concrete structures, soft roof.

References

Notes

Sources

Cities and towns in Ulyanovsk Oblast
Populated places on the Volga
Cities and towns built in the Soviet Union
Populated places established in 1960